Kahriz-e Sefid (also Romanized as Kahrīz-e Sefīd and Kahrīz Sefīd; also known as Ghār Safīd and Kard Sefīd) is a village in Japelaq-e Gharbi Rural District, Japelaq District, Azna County, Lorestan Province, Iran. At the 2006 census, its population was 55, in 14 families.

References 

Towns and villages in Azna County